Paara is a 1985 Indian Malayalam-language film, directed and produced by Alleppey Ashraf. The film stars Kalpana, Bheeman Raghu, Sukumari, K P Natarajan and Jagathy Sreekumar. The film has musical score by Kannur Rajan.

Cast
Kalpana
Bheeman Raghu
Sukumari
Jagathy Sreekumar
Anuradha
Babitha Justin
Kundara Johny
Kuthiravattam Pappu
Madhu Attukal
Santhakumari

Soundtrack
The music was composed by Kannur Rajan with lyrics by Ilanthoor Vijayakumar and Vijayan.

References

External links
 

1985 films
1980s Malayalam-language films
Films directed by Alleppey Ashraf